Sir Robert Deane, 5th Baronet PC (Ire) (c. 1707 – 7 February 1770) was an Irish barrister-at-law and politician.

He was the third son of Sir Matthew Deane, 3rd Baronet and his wife Jane Sharpe, only daughter of Reverend William Sharpe. In 1751, he succeeded his older brother Matthew as baronet. He was invested to the Privy Council of Ireland in 1768 and represented Tallow in the Irish House of Commons from 1757 to 1768. The following year, he stood for Carysfort, a seat he held until his death in 1770.

On 24 August 1738, he married Charleton Tilson, second daughter of Thomas Tilson. They had six daughters and four sons. Robert, the oldest surviving son, succeeded to the baronetcy and was later raised to the Peerage of Ireland as  Baron Muskerry, while his younger brother Jocelyn Deane was also a Member of Parliament.

References

1700s births
1770 deaths
Baronets in the Baronetage of Ireland
Irish MPs 1727–1760
Irish MPs 1761–1768
Irish MPs 1769–1776
Members of the Privy Council of Ireland
Members of the Parliament of Ireland (pre-1801) for County Waterford constituencies
Members of the Parliament of Ireland (pre-1801) for County Wicklow constituencies